The 2nd United States Colored Infantry was an infantry regiment that served in the Union Army during the American Civil War. The regiment was composed of African American enlisted men commanded by white officers and was authorized by the Bureau of Colored Troops which was created by the United States War Department on May 22, 1863.

Service 
The 2nd U.S. Colored Infantry was organized in Arlington, Virginia June 20 through November 11, 1863 and mustered in for three-year service. The regiment was attached to District of Key West, Florida, Department of the Gulf, February 1864 to July 1865. Department of Florida to January 1866. The 2nd U.S. Colored Infantry mustered out of service January 5, 1866.

Detailed service 
Ordered to the Department of the Gulf December 1863. Duty at New Orleans, La., and Ship Island, Miss., until February 13, 1864. Ordered to Key West, Fla., February 13. Affair at Tampa, Fla., May 5. Operations on the west coast of Florida July 1-31. Expedition from Fort Myers to Bayport July 1-4. Expedition from Cedar Key to St. Andrew's Bay July 20-29. Fort Taylor August 21. Station No. 4 February 13, 1865. Attack on Fort Myers February 20. Operations in the vicinity of St. Mark's February 21-March 7. East River Bridge March 4-5. Newport Bridge March 5-6. Natural Bridge March 6. Duty in District of Florida until January 1866.

Casualties 
The regiment lost a total of 173 men during service; 3 officers and 24 enlisted men killed or mortally wounded, 11 officers and 135 enlisted men died of disease.

See also 

 List of United States Colored Troops Civil War Units
 United States Colored Troops

References 
 Dyer, Frederick H. (1959). A Compendium of the War of the Rebellion. Sagamore Press Inc. Thomas Yoseloff, Publisher, New York, New York. .
 Tarbox, Increase N. Missionary Patriots: Memoirs of James H. Schneider and Edward M. Schneider (Boston: Massachusetts Sabbath School Society), 1867.

United States Colored Troops Civil War units and formations
Military units and formations established in 1863
Military units and formations disestablished in 1866